The Self Propelled 17pdr, Valentine, Mk I, Archer was a British tank destroyer of the Second World War based on the Valentine infantry tank chassis fitted with an Ordnance QF 17 pounder gun. Designed and manufactured by Vickers-Armstrongs, 655 were produced between March 1943 and May 1945. It was used in north-west Europe and Italy during the war; post-war, it served with the Egyptian Army. This vehicle was unusual in that its gun faced the rear of the chassis instead of the front.

Design and development
The 17 pounder anti-tank gun was very powerful but also very large and heavy and could be moved about the battlefield only by a vehicle, which made the gun more effective in defence than in the attack. A variant of the Churchill tank had been built in 1942 as a self-propelled gun - the "3-inch Gun Carrier" - and the US was expected to be able to provide the 76 mm armed M10 tank destroyer through Lend-lease. Other projects were considered using obsolete tank chassis, including the Valentine for its reliability and low profile and the Crusader for its good power-to-weight ratio. In development were tank designs using the 17-pounder, which led to the Cruiser Mk VIII Challenger tank (and its post-war variant the Avenger SP gun) derived from the Cromwell cruiser tank and the Sherman Firefly conversion of the Sherman tank.

The Valentine chassis was soon chosen, as it was in production but obsolescent for British use and was also one of the few chassis that could accommodate such a large gun. The engine in the Archer had a higher power rating than in the Valentine. Since the Valentine had a small hull and it was not possible to use a turret, the gun was mounted in a simple, low, open-topped armoured box, very much like the early Panzerjäger German self-propelled guns in appearance, with the gun facing to the rear, which kept the length of the Archer short. The mounting allowed for 11 degrees of traverse to either side, with elevation from -7.5 to +15 degrees.

On firing, the gun breech recoiled just shy of the driver's space, with the driver staying in position, in case the vehicle needed to move quickly. The rear mounting combined with its low silhouette made the Archer an excellent ambush weapon, allowing its crew to fire, then drive away without turning round. The first prototype was completed in 1943, with firing trials carried out in April 1943. Vickers were given orders for 800 vehicles.

Service

Production started in mid-1943 and the Archer entered service in October 1944. It was used in North-West Europe and (in 1945) in Italy. By the end of the war, 655 of them had been produced.

Under military doctrines prevalent in Commonwealth armies at the time, vehicles such as the Archer were "self-propelled anti-tank guns" and operated by the Royal Artillery (RA), rather than Royal Armoured Corps (RAC).  This was the same for two vehicles of US origin, that were initially conceived as "tank destroyers" though not used as such by the British: the 3 in. Self-Propelled Mount M10 and 17 pdr Self-Propelled Achilles.)

Post-war, the Egyptian Army received 200 ex-British Archers after the 1948 Arab-Israeli War. Some were successfully used against Israeli armour in 1956. The Archer served with some units of the Royal Armoured Corps in the British Army of the Rhine (BAOR) in the early 1950s.

Jordanian Arab Legion and National Guard were supplied with 36 ex-British Archers in 1952.

Surviving vehicles 
Surviving vehicles are preserved at
 Yad La-Shiryon museum in Latrun
 National War and Resistance Museum, Overloon in the Netherlands
 The Tank Museum in the UK 
 The Wheatcroft Collection in the UK, awaiting restoration
 Cavalry Tank Museum, Ahmednagar, India. One Archer with a short-barrelled gun minus gun mantlet 
 Australian Armour and Artillery Museum in Cairns, Australia
 The Royal Tank Museum, Amman, Jordan

References

Further reading

External links

 OnWar
 The Archer Tank Destroyer wwiiequipment.com
 

World War II armoured fighting vehicles of the United Kingdom
World War II tank destroyers
Archer
Military vehicles introduced from 1940 to 1944